Huguenot is a neighborhood on the South Shore of Staten Island, New York City.  Originally named "Bloomingview", it was later named for the Huguenots, led by Daniel Perrin, who settled in the area during the late 17th and early 18th centuries to escape religious persecution. Huguenot is bordered by Arden Heights to the north, Woodrow to the west, Prince's Bay to the south, and Annadale to the east.  The neighborhood is represented in the New York City Council by Joe Borelli, who was born and raised there. Huguenot is represented in the New York State Senate by Andrew Lanza and in the New York State Assembly by Michael Reilly.

History
The community was named after French Protestants fleeing persecution in Catholic-dominated France who settled in the area in the 17th century, and formed one of the first permanent settlements on Staten Island.

The Huguenot station along the Staten Island Railway opened when the railroad was extended to Tottenville in 1860.  This station was given the name "Huguenot Park", even though no park was actually located nearby, and by 1971 the word "Park" had been dropped. The name survives in the Huguenot Park branch of the New York Public Library was opened one block west of the station.

Religion
The local Roman Catholic parish, Our Lady Star of the Sea, is one of the largest parishes on the South Shore, and has experienced overcrowding problems for many years because of the rapid boom of new residents in the area.

Library

The New York Public Library (NYPL) operates the Huguenot Park branch at 830 Huguenot Avenue, near the intersection with Drumgoole Road East. The branch opened in January 1985, replacing what was once the smallest New York Public Library building just east of the station (still standing). The Huguenot Park branch was possibly named in honor of the nearby Staten Island Railway station's former name.

Transportation
Huguenot is served by the Staten Island Railway at the Huguenot station. Huguenot is also served by the  local buses on Luten Avenue, and the  local buses on Hylan Boulevard. Express bus service is provided by the  along Huguenot Avenue and Woodrow Road, the  along Woodrow Road, the  along Foster Road, and the  along Huguenot Avenue.

References

Neighborhoods in Staten Island
Huguenot history in the United States